Since Sri Lanka gained independence in 1948, the Lanka Sama Samaja Party (LSSP) has seen a steady number of splits and breakaway factions. Some of the breakaway organisations have succeeded as independent parties, some have become defunct, while others have merged with the parent party or other political parties.

List of breakaway parties

References 

India politics-related lists
Sri Lanka politics-related lists
Political schisms
Politics of Sri Lanka